Isabelle Le Boulch (born 29 December 1964) is a French footballer who plays as a striker for French club Saint-Brieuc SC of the Division 1 Féminine.

International career

Le Boulch  represented France 27 times between 1985 and 1992.

References

1964 births
En Avant Guingamp (women) players
French women's footballers
France women's international footballers
Division 1 Féminine players
Living people
Women's association footballers not categorized by position